Dundgovi or Dundgobi (Middle Gobi) is one of the 21 aimags (provinces) of Mongolia. Its capital is Mandalgovi. Dundgovi is the second least populated Province.

Climate 
It consists largely of semi-arid steppe and low hills. Temperatures in the summer may top , while winter temperatures may dip below . Precipitation is scarce, and air humidity is low.

Seasonal climatic problems include spring sandstorms and winter zud.

Transportation 
There is no commercial air transport to the Dundgobi province.  Public transportation includes bus  but many of the more rural sums are not on the mass transport lines.  Much travel is done via  (micro-bus or Russian furgon) or by private jeeps. The capital, Mandalgovi, is connected to Ulaanbaatar by a  paved road completed in 2013.

Many locals own 250 cc motorcycles, which they use as their main mode of transportation.

Local economy 
The province's main industry is animal husbandry and livestock products (such as wool, cashmere).  The Dundgobi province is also noted among Mongolian locals for its airag (fermented horse milk), a traditional Mongolian alcoholic drink.

Administrative subdivisions 

* Sum centre is aimag capital Mandalgovi

References 

 
Provinces of Mongolia
States and territories established in 1942
1942 establishments in Mongolia